is a former Japanese football player.

Playing career
Ikeda was born in Ibaraki on July 3, 1980. After graduating from Shimizu Commercial High School, he joined the J1 League club Urawa Reds in 1999. He played many matches as center back during the first season. However the club was relegated to the J2 League in 2000. Although he did not play at all in 2000, the club was promoted to J1 in a year. In 2001, he played in many matches again. However he did not play at all in 2002. In 2003, he moved to the J2 club Shonan Bellmare. Although he was with the team for two seasons, he did not play much and retired at the end of the 2004 season.

Club statistics

References

External links

J.League

1980 births
Living people
Association football people from Osaka Prefecture
Japanese footballers
J1 League players
J2 League players
Urawa Red Diamonds players
Shonan Bellmare players
Association football defenders
People from Ibaraki, Osaka